Southlands College, in Roehampton in the London Borough of Wandsworth, is one of four colleges at the University of Roehampton and is the location of the University's Business School and its Department of Media, Culture and Language.

It was established by the Methodist Church in 1872, originally  in Battersea, as a teacher training college for women and became coeducational in 1965.

In 1975, the college became part of the Roehampton Institute of Higher Education, which became Roehampton University in 2004.

The college includes Mount Clare House,  a grade I listed building  designed by Sir Robert Taylor, and a Methodist chapel.

See also
 Armorial of UK universities
 List of universities in the UK

References

External links
 Southlands College, University of Roehampton
 University of Roehampton

1872 establishments in England
Educational institutions established in 1872
Education in London
Roehampton
University of Roehampton
Teacher training colleges in the United Kingdom
Methodist universities and colleges
Former women's universities and colleges in the United Kingdom